At the 1904 Summer Olympics, two golf events were contested – men's individual and team tournaments. The competitions were held from September 17, 1904 to September 24, 1904. It was the second and final appearance of the sport at the Olympics until the 2016 Summer Olympics. The men's individual event was switched to a match play tournament rather than the stroke play used four years earlier.

Format
There were two golf events at the 1904 Olympic Games. The first was a team championship open to golf associations, and contested over 36 holes of stroke play by teams of ten amateur golfers with all scores counting towards the team total. It was followed by an individual event contested as a match play knockout by the leading 32 players following a 36-hole stroke play qualifying round, with each match played over 36 holes.

Medal summary

Participating nations
A total of 77 golfers from 2 nations competed at the St. Louis Games:

Medal table

Notes

References

Sources
International Olympic Committee results database
George Seymour Lyon - Olympic Individual gold medal winner 1904
 

 
1904
1904 Summer Olympics events
Golf tournaments in the United States
Golf in Missouri
1904 in golf
1904 in sports in Missouri